Park Seon-chul (born 9 November 1973) is a South Korean volleyball player. He competed in the men's tournament at the 1996 Summer Olympics.

References

1973 births
Living people
South Korean men's volleyball players
Olympic volleyball players of South Korea
Volleyball players at the 1996 Summer Olympics
Place of birth missing (living people)
Asian Games medalists in volleyball
Volleyball players at the 1998 Asian Games
Asian Games silver medalists for South Korea
Medalists at the 1998 Asian Games
20th-century South Korean people